We Rock may refer to:

 "We Rock" (Camp Rock song), by the cast of the film Camp Rock
 We Rock (video), a 2005 performance video by Dio
 "We Rock", a song by Dio from the 1984 album The Last in Line
 We Rock: Drum King, a 2009 music video game